Gurcharan Das Mehta (20 December 1885—17 February 1975), also known as Param Guru Mehta Ji Maharaj, was the sixth Revered Satguru of the  Radha Soami Satsang Dayalbagh. He was born on 20 December 1885 in Batala, to a respectable Punjabi family. His father was Shri Atma Ram Sahab Mehta. He studied from Thomason College of Civil Engineering, Roorkee (now IIT Roorkee) and served in Punjab Government.

Mehta became Sant Satguru of Radha Soami Satsang Dayalbagh on 24 June 1937. He stressed on agricultural work  and Seva. He also strengthened the industries and educational institutions of Dayalbagh and was known as the Architect of Dayalbagh.

References

Further reading
 David Christopher Lane, 1992, The Radhasoami Tradition: A Critical History of Guru Successorship

Radha Soami
Surat Shabd Yoga
Sant Mat gurus
1885 births
1976 deaths